Under My Nails is a Puerto Rican erotic crime thriller film directed by Ari Maniel Cruz, and written, produced and starting Kisha Tikina Burgos. It also stars actor Antonio Pantojas. The film's title refers to its primary protagonist's occupation as a nail salon tech. It is set in New York City, New York, United States.

Summary 

Solimar, a Puerto Rican salon employee, is caught between her increasing desire towards her Dominican neighbor Roberto and the suspicion that he violently murdered his Haitian wife.

Honors

References 

Puerto Rican films
Films set in 2011
Films set in New York City
Films shot in New York City
2012 crime thriller films
2010s erotic thriller films